Geminaria is a genus of bee flies (insects in the family Bombyliidae).

As a result of research published in 2019, this genus was transferred from the subfamily Bombyliinae to Lordotinae.

Species
These two species belong to the genus Geminaria:
 Geminaria canalis (Coquillett, 1887)
 Geminaria pellucida Coquillett, 1894

References

Articles created by Qbugbot
Bombyliidae genera